Slobodan Aljančić (12 March 1922, Belgrade – 19 March 1993 Belgrade) was a Serbian mathematician who worked on functional analysis.

References

1922 births
1993 deaths
20th-century Serbian mathematicians
Yugoslav mathematicians
Scientists from Belgrade